Hamburger Concerto is the fourth studio album by the Dutch progressive rock band Focus, released in April 1974. It peaked at #20 on the UK charts. The title track is based on Variations on a Theme by Haydn by Johannes Brahms. The composition also incorporates the first two verses of the Dutch Christmas carol O Kerstnacht, schoner dan de dagen at around 15 min. The first track is based on a Gaillarde of Joachim van den Hove of his work Delitae Musicae.

Track listing

Vinyl release, 1974

CD release, 1988

Personnel
Focus
Thijs van Leer – Hammond organ, flute, piano, harpsichord, moog, ARP synthesizer, recorder, mellotron, accordion, pipe organ, the organ of St.Mary the Virgin, Barnes, vocals
Jan Akkerman – guitars, lute, timpani, handclaps
Bert Ruiter – bass guitar, autoharp, triangles, finger cymbals, bells, handclaps
Colin Allen – drums, congas, tambourine, castanets, cabasa, wood block, gong, timpani, handclaps, flexatone, cuica

Charts

Certifications

References

1974 albums
Focus (band) albums
Albums produced by Mike Vernon (record producer)
Atco Records albums
albums recorded at Olympic Sound Studios